Acordulecera is a genus of sawflies in the family Pergidae. There are more than 20 described species in Acordulecera.

Species
These 29 species belong to the genus Acordulecera:

 Acordulecera antennata Rohwer
 Acordulecera basirufa Rohwer
 Acordulecera caryae Rohwer
 Acordulecera chilensis Smith
 Acordulecera comoa Smith
 Acordulecera dorsalis Say, 1836
 Acordulecera ducra Smith
 Acordulecera erythrogastra Rohwer
 Acordulecera flavipes Rohwer
 Acordulecera foveata Rohwer
 Acordulecera grisselli Smith, 2010
 Acordulecera hicoriae Rohwer
 Acordulecera knabi Rohwer
 Acordulecera longica Smith
 Acordulecera maculata
 Acordulecera mellina
 Acordulecera montserratensis Smith
 Acordulecera munroi Smith
 Acordulecera nigrata Rohwer
 Acordulecera nigritarsis Rohwer
 Acordulecera parva Rohwer
 Acordulecera portiae Rohwer
 Acordulecera quercus Rohwer
 Acordulecera sahlbergi (Forsius, 1925)
 Acordulecera scutellata Rohwer
 Acordulecera sonoita Smith, 2010
 Acordulecera tristis
 Acordulecera whittelli Smith, 2010
 Acordulecera willei Smith

References

External links

 

Tenthredinoidea